The 2008–09 Qatari League or Q-League season was the 36th edition of top level football in Qatar and started on the 13 September 2008.

The season was played in 3 stages:

The 2008–09 calendar released by the QFA saw the first phase run through 13 September till 23 November before phase two kicked off on 27 November to end on 7 February 2009. The final phase started on February 12 and concluded on April 17.

Ten teams played for the title of league champions with each outfit playing 27 matches. The last team in the standings was to be relegated until the QFA announced an expansion to the league for the following season.

The competition will be played at the seven stadiums of Al-Sadd, Al-Rayyan Sports Club, Al-Gharrafa, Al Wakrah, Al Khor, Qatar Sports Club, and Al-Arabi Sports Club.

Al-Gharrafa won the title last season after pipping powerhouse Al-Sadd into second place while Al Shamal were relegated and their place in the top division will now be taken up by Al Khuratiyat SC.

League Expansion

The Qatar Stars League has slowly expanded since the turn of the decade, moving from 9 clubs to 10 clubs and then latest setup of 12 clubs for the 2009–10 Qatari League campaign.

There are 2 divisions in the Qatari football structure and the league has previously seen one club promoted and relegated each year except in 'expansion' years.

It was announced on 15 April 2009 that no clubs would be relegated from the top flight in the Qatari League 2008-09 season, due to expansion reasons. The announcement was made with only one game remaining.

Members clubs

Managerial changes

Final league table

Top scorers
25 goals
  Magno Alves (Umm-Salal)
21 goals
  Leonardo Pisculichi (Al-Arabi)
20 goals
  Clemerson (Al-Gharafa)
19 goals
  Sebastián Soria (Qatar SC)
  Amara Diané (Al-Rayyan)
15 goals
  Khalfan Ibrahim (Al-Sadd)
13 goals
  Agyemang Opoku (Al-Sadd)
11 goals
  Pascal Feindouno (Al-Sadd)
  Amad Al-Hosni (Al-Rayyan)
  Sayed Mohamed Adnan (Al-Khor)
  Jean-Emmanuel Effa Owona (Al-Sailiya)
10 goals
  Fernandão (Al-Gharafa)
  Moumouni Dagano (Al-Khor)
  Anouar Diba (Al Wakra)

References

External links
 Qatari League Goalzz
 QFA | Qatar Football Association - Home Arabic
 QFA | Qatar Football Association - Home English
 News About the Qatar League

Qatar Stars League seasons
2008–09 in Asian association football leagues
1